The Christian Service University College is one of the university colleges accredited by the National Accreditation Board in the past decade. It is affiliated to the University of Ghana, and the University of Cape Coast. It is located in Kumasi, the second largest city in Ghana.

History
The Worldwide Evangelization for Christ (WEC) had acquired property in Kumasi on which they had built four dwelling houses and a radio studio with plans to construct a large building to serve as the beginning of a training college.

In October 1974, the first residential classes started with four students; by 2020, the college had become an evangelical Christian university.

Campus
The university is based on a main campus within Kumasi, the capital of the Ashanti Region.

Programmes

Undergraduate (Degree Programmes)
Bachelor of Arts in Theology with Administration 
Bachelor of Arts in communication studies
Bachelor of Arts in Planning and Development
 Bachelor of Science in Physician Assistantship
 Bachelor of Science in Midwifery
 Bachelor of Science in Nursing
 Bachelor of Science in Computer science
 Bachelor Of Science In Information Technology
Bachelor of Business Administration: Human Resource Management 
Bachelor of Business Administration: Marketing
Bachelor of Business Administration: Accounting
Bachelor of Business Administration: Banking and Finance

Postgraduate (Master Programmes)
 Master of Arts in Christian Ministry with Management
 Master of Science in Accounting and Finance
 Master of Science in Monitoring and Evaluation
 Master of Science in Corporate Planning and Governance

Students and faculty
The university has 161 support and faculty staff. The student population as at January 2020 is 1,904

Students' Representative Council
The university has a students union known as the Students Representative Council. This has existed since 1983.

See also
List of universities in Ghana

Notes

Christian universities and colleges in Ghana
Educational institutions established in 1974
1974 establishments in Ghana